Pyrausta euergestalis is a moth in the family Crambidae. It was described by Hans Georg Amsel in 1954 and is found in Iran.

References

Moths described in 1954
euergestalis
Moths of Asia